Sheykh Mahalleh or Shaikh Mahalleh may refer to:

Gilan Province
 Sheykh Mahalleh, Astara
 Sheykh Mahalleh, Rezvanshahr
 Sheykh Mahalleh, Shaft
 Sheykh Mahalleh, Sowme'eh Sara
 Sheykh Mahalleh, Talesh

Mazandaran Province
 Sheykh Mahalleh, Amol
 Sheykh Mahalleh, Babol
 Sheykh Mahalleh, Behshahr